Marist Catholic High School is a private Roman Catholic, college preparatory school in Eugene, Oregon, United States founded by the Marist Brothers. It is part of the Roman Catholic Archdiocese of Portland. Its motto is "We are One".

Academics
In 1985, Marist High School was honored in the Blue Ribbon Schools Program, the highest honor a school can receive in the United States.

Notable alumni
 Justin King, acoustic guitarist
 Steve Lyons, Class of 1978, professional baseball player (Boston Red Sox, Chicago White Sox); broadcaster with Fox Sports

References

Catholic secondary schools in Oregon
Marist Brothers schools
High schools in Lane County, Oregon
Education in Eugene, Oregon
Educational institutions established in 1968
Schools accredited by the Northwest Accreditation Commission
1968 establishments in Oregon
Roman Catholic Archdiocese of Portland in Oregon